Vladimir Pavlovich Zagorovsky (29 June 1925, Voronezh, Russia, formerly USSR – 6 November 1994, Voronezh, Russia) was a Russian chess grandmaster of correspondence chess.  He is most famous for being the fourth ICCF World Champion between 1962 and 1965. He won the 1952 Moscow City Championship. In the July 1972 FIDE rating list he had an over the board rating of 2370.

Selected titles 
 1948: Master of Sports of the USSR (chess)
 1991: Honored Master of Sports of the USSR (chess)

Books

Notes and references

References

References

External links
 
 

1925 births
1994 deaths
Sportspeople from Voronezh
Writers from Voronezh
World Correspondence Chess Champions
Correspondence chess grandmasters
Russian chess players
Soviet chess players
Soviet chess writers
Soviet male writers
20th-century male writers
20th-century chess players